Dean Allan DeBlois (born June 7, 1970) is a Canadian film director, film producer, screenwriter, and animator. He is best known for writing and directing the Oscar-nominated animated films Lilo & Stitch for Walt Disney Animation Studios (with Chris Sanders), the How to Train Your Dragon film trilogy for DreamWorks Animation (the first film also with Sanders), and directing the documentary Heima about the Icelandic band Sigur Rós.

Early life
DeBlois was born and raised in Aylmer, Quebec, Canada. As a boy he was interested in comic books, which he later said influenced his drawing ability, imagination and storytelling. Growing up poor, he would visit a nearby smoke shop on weekends, where the proprietor let him read comics for free. Memorizing them, he went home and drew. DeBlois attended Darcy McGee High School.

Career
DeBlois began his career as an assistant animator and layout artist for Hinton Animation Studios/Lacewood Productions in Ottawa, Ontario, while simultaneously attending Sheridan College's three year Classical Animation program in Oakville, Ontario. From 1988 to 1990, DeBlois contributed to such productions as The Raccoons (TV series), The Teddy Bears' Picnic (TV special), and The Nutcracker Prince (feature animated film).

Upon graduation from Sheridan College in 1990, DeBlois was hired by Sullivan Bluth Studios in Dublin, Ireland. There, he worked as a layout artist, character designer, and storyboard assistant to Don Bluth on such feature animated films as A Troll in Central Park and Thumbelina.

In 1994, DeBlois left Dublin for Los Angeles to begin work for Walt Disney Feature Animation as a storyboard artist, where he worked alongside his frequent collaborator, Chris Sanders, as Head of Story on Mulan. Shortly thereafter, they re-teamed to create Lilo & Stitch.

Following its release in 2002, DeBlois sold several original live action feature film projects to write, direct, and produce, including an Irish ghost story titled The Banshee and Finn Magee, a psychological thriller titled The Lighthouse, and a family adventure series titled Sightings, which were optioned at Walt Disney Pictures, Touchstone Pictures, and Universal Studios respectively.

DeBlois' feature-length music documentary film Heima chronicles the homecoming concert of Iceland's Sigur Rós.

In October 2008, DeBlois returned to feature animation to co-write and co-direct DreamWorks Animation's then-troubled How to Train Your Dragon, once again re-teaming with Sanders. The duo re-envisioned the film's story and shepherded the production to its March 2010 release. The resulting film became the studio's top-grossing film in North America outside of the Shrek franchise.

During that same time, DeBlois also directed another feature-length music film for Sigur Rós front-man Jónsi, entitled Go Quiet, as well as a feature-length concert film entitled Jónsi: Live at The Wiltern.

DeBlois wrote and directed the fantasy/action film How to Train Your Dragon 2, a sequel to the original, which was released on June 13, 2014, followed by How to Train Your Dragon: The Hidden World on February 22, 2019.

On September 23, 2019, DeBlois was attached to write and direct a film adaptation of the Micronauts.

In February 2023, a live-action adaptation of How to Train Your Dragon was announced with DeBlois returning to direct, write, and produce. The film is slated to release on March 14, 2025.

Personal life
DeBlois is openly gay, and told The Advocate that people in the industry "knew that one of us was gay" but mistakenly assumed it was his straight screenwriting partner Chris Sanders, because DeBlois "hobbled in there looking like a redneck."

Filmography

Films

Animation department

Television series

References

External links
 
 

1970 births
Canadian animated film directors
Canadian animated film producers
Animation screenwriters
Film producers from Quebec
Canadian male screenwriters
Canadian storyboard artists
Canadian gay writers
Canadian gay artists
LGBT film directors
Living people
Sheridan College animation program alumni
Artists from Ontario
Artists from Quebec
French Quebecers
Anglophone Quebec people
Film directors from Ontario
Film directors from Quebec
Sullivan Bluth Studios people
Walt Disney Animation Studios people
DreamWorks Animation people
Annie Award winners
Writers from Ontario
Writers from Gatineau
Canadian LGBT screenwriters
LGBT film producers
People from Brockville
Gay screenwriters
LGBT animators
Fantasy film directors
20th-century Canadian screenwriters
20th-century Canadian male writers
20th-century Canadian LGBT people
21st-century Canadian screenwriters
21st-century Canadian male writers
21st-century Canadian LGBT people